The 2021 Engie Open Andrézieux-Bouthéon 42 was a professional women's tennis tournament played on indoor hard courts. It was the eleventh edition of the tournament which was part of the 2021 ITF Women's World Tennis Tour. It took place in Andrézieux-Bouthéon, France between 25 and 31 January 2021.

Singles main-draw entrants

Seeds

 1 Rankings are as of 18 January 2021.

Other entrants
The following players received wildcards into the singles main draw:
  Amandine Hesse
  Elsa Jacquemot
  Diane Parry
  Harmony Tan

The following player received entry using a junior exempt:
  Victoria Jiménez Kasintseva

The following player received entry using a protected ranking:
  Lu Jiajing

The following players received entry from the qualifying draw:
  Susan Bandecchi
  Gaëlle Desperrier
  Federica Di Sarra
  Salma Djoubri
  Diāna Marcinkēviča
  Rebecca Šramková
  Urszula Radwańska
  Kathinka von Deichmann

Champions

Singles

 Harmony Tan def.  Jaqueline Cristian, 3–6, 6–2, 6–1

Doubles

 Lu Jiajing /  You Xiaodi def.  Paula Kania-Choduń /  Katarina Zavatska, 6–3, 6–4

References

External links
 2021 Engie Open Andrézieux-Bouthéon 42 at ITFtennis.com
 Official website

2021 ITF Women's World Tennis Tour
2021 in French tennis
January 2021 sports events in France
Open Andrézieux-Bouthéon 42